Simha Baludu is a 1978 Indian Telugu-language swashbuckler film written and directed by K. Raghavendra Rao from a story by D. V. Narasa Raju. It stars N. T. Rama Rao and Vanisri, with music composed by M. S. Viswanathan. The film was released on 11 August 1978 to negative reviews and despite the grand opening ended up as a box-office bomb.

Plot 
Once upon on time, there was a kingdom ruled by an innocent King (Rao Gopal Rao). His chief commander Raghunath Nayaka (Satyanarayana), who dedicated his life to the dynasty gets relieved of his duties due to old age and hands over the charge to new army chief Gajapathi (Mohan Babu). Gajapathi takes advantage of the innocence of the King and starts harassing the people of the kingdom. Rajendra (N. T. Rama Rao) is a young, dynamic, energetic guy whose aim is to end this monarchy and establish democracy. He is not able to tolerate these atrocities and fights against them. Meanwhile, the king's daughter Princess Vani (Vanisri) feels the palace as a prison, that's why she comes out in different attires, gets acquaintance with Rajendra and they fall in love. Once in the annual ceremony, competitions have been held, in which Gajapathi wins, but Rajendra arrives and defeats him. The King offers facilitation but he refuses and leaves the court. Raghupathi Nayaka feels that Rajendra must be his son who left home in the childhood due to the same differences of monarchy and democracy. He follows him and confirms that Rajendra is his son.

Meanwhile, Gajapathi goes to capture Rajendra, molests Seeta (Pallavi), whom Rajendra treats as his own sister and destroys the entire village. Rajendra in a rage, goes to court to kill Gajapathi, but was caught by soldiers. During the time of judgment, the King asks Raghupathi Nayaka to give his verdict about punishment. Raghupathi says that Rajendra is ostracized to live on an island lifelong. Rajendra goes to the island ruled by Rani Rana Chandi (Jaya Malini), who treats the prisoners as slaves, is attracted towards Rajendra and tries to seduce him, but he does not yield to it. Eventually, Princess Vani visits there as the guest. with her help, Rajendra destroys the fort on the island and he gets the prisoners released from slavery. They establish a force and bring a revolution in the country. Knowing about this, Gajapathi blames Raghunath Nayaka as a traitor and he is behind the revolution. Loyal Raghunath asks for a chance to prove his innocence and moves to arrest Rajendra. But unfortunately, Raghunath Nayaka is defeated in the war and he asks Rajendra to kill him because he cannot live with the blame as a traitor. Rajendra is not able to see his father's downfall and surrenders himself. By the time they reach the fort, Gajapathi grabs the kingdom and arrests the king and the princess. Rajendra destroys the evil forces and protects the kingdom. Finally, the King makes Rajendra as the leader and in turn, he establishes democratic government.

Cast 

N. T. Rama Rao as Rajendra
Vanisri as Vani
Rao Gopal Rao as Maharaju
Satyanarayana as Raghunatha Nayakudu
Mohan Babu as Gajapathi
Tyagaraju
Mada as Govindu
Sarathi as Vikata Kavi
P. J. Sarma as Mahamantri
Kakarala
Jagga Rao
Anjali Devi as Bhagyam
Rama Prabha
Jayamalini as Rani Rana Chandi
Halam as item number
Pallavi as Seeta

Soundtrack 

Music composed by M. S. Viswanathan. Lyrics were written by Veturi.

References

External links 
 

1970s historical fantasy films
1970s Telugu-language films
Films based on Indian folklore
Films directed by K. Raghavendra Rao
Films scored by M. S. Viswanathan
Historical epic films
Indian epic films
Indian historical fantasy films
Indian swashbuckler films